Auburn Township is one of fifteen townships in the center of Clark County, Illinois, USA.  As of the 2010 census, its population was 242 and it contained 124 housing units.

History
Auburn Township was created in 1859 and consisted of land taken from Anderson, Dolson, Marshall and Martinsville Townships in Clark County. According to the History of Crawford and Clark Counties, Illinois, the creation was the result of gerrymandering to facilitate the election of an unidentified influential person to be a justice of the peace. The township was named for the already existing village of Auburn.

The village of Auburn had vied with the town of Marshall as the seat of Clark County. Auburn had the advantage of being centrally located. However, Marshall had the larger population and received more votes. Auburn's defeat has been blamed for ruining the village's dreams of growth.

Geography

Unincorporated towns
 Adenmoor
 Auburn (village)
 Clark Center
(This list is based on USGS data and may include former settlements.)

Major highways
  Interstate 70
  U.S. Route 40

Demographics

School districts
 Marshall Community Unit School District 2c
 Martinsville Community Unit School District 3c

Political districts
 Illinois' 15th congressional district
 State House District 109
 State Senate District 55

Sources
 Perrin, William Henry, ed.. History of Crawford and Clark Counties, Illinois Chicago, Illinois. O. L. Baskin & Co. (1883).

References
 
 United States Census Bureau 2007 TIGER/Line Shapefiles
 United States National Atlas

External links
 City-Data.com
 Illinois State Archives

Townships in Clark County, Illinois
Townships in Illinois